Baillon is a surname of French origin. Notable people with the surname include:

Henri Ernest Baillon (1827–1895), French physician and botanist
Louis Antoine François Baillon (1778–1851), French naturalist and collector
Louis Charles Baillon (1881–1965), Falkland Islands field-hockey player
Susan Janet Baillon (1957), aka Siouxsie Sioux, British singer-songwriter